Osama Faisal Ahmed Abdelhady Eltraawy (born 1 January  2001) is an Egyptian professional footballer who plays as a forward for Egyptian League club Zamalek.

Career statistics

Club

References

External links
 
 

Living people
Egyptian footballers
Egypt youth international footballers
Association football forwards
Zamalek SC players
Egyptian Premier League players
2001 births